The University of Western Kordofan (or Jameat Gareb Kordofan) is a university in the state of Western Kordofan, Sudan. It is based in Al-Foula, but has campuses in Khartoum, Babanusa, Balnhod and Abozbd.

References

Universities and colleges in Sudan
South Kordofan
Educational institutions established in 1990
1990 establishments in Sudan